Ladislav Kříž (born 28 January 1944) is a Czech former athlete who competed in the 1972 Summer Olympics.

References

1944 births
Living people
Czech male sprinters
Czechoslovak male sprinters
Olympic athletes of Czechoslovakia
Athletes (track and field) at the 1972 Summer Olympics
European Athletics Championships medalists